Wojciechowo may refer to the following places:
Wojciechowo, Jarocin County in Greater Poland Voivodeship (west-central Poland)
Wojciechowo, Gmina Rzgów in Greater Poland Voivodeship (west-central Poland)
Wojciechowo, Masovian Voivodeship (east-central Poland)
Wojciechowo, Koło County in Greater Poland Voivodeship (west-central Poland)
Wojciechowo, Gmina Wierzbinek in Greater Poland Voivodeship (west-central Poland)
Wojciechowo, Oborniki County in Greater Poland Voivodeship (west-central Poland)
Wojciechowo, Wolsztyn County in Greater Poland Voivodeship (west-central Poland)
Wojciechowo, Pomeranian Voivodeship (north Poland)
Wojciechowo, Warmian-Masurian Voivodeship (north Poland)